Iris Meredith (born Iris Shunn; June 3, 1915 – January 22, 1980) was a B-movie actress of the 1930s and 1940s film era. She starred mostly in heroine roles, in westerns.

Early years
Meredith was born in Sioux City, Iowa, but grew up in Eagle Rock, California. She was active in journalism and dramatics at Eagle Rock High School, from which she graduated. She worked as a cashier in a Los Angeles theater before she became an actress.

Career

Meredith began her film career in the early 1930s, often starring in film serials while on contract with Columbia Pictures. Her best-known roles were in the 1938 serial The Spider's Web, and in the 1939 serial Overland with Kit Carson. In 1940 she starred in the serial The Green Archer, as well as in several westerns opposite Charles Starrett, Bill Elliott, and Bob Allen. Most of her films were with Starrett, from 1936 through 1940, most notably Riders of the Black River and Spoilers of the Range.

Her career slowed mid-way through the 1940s. In 1941 she starred in The Son of Davy Crockett with Bill Elliott, and Caught in the Act opposite Henry Armetta. In 1942 she starred alongside Dave O'Brien in The Texas Rangers Take Over. Her last credited role was the 1943 film The Kid Rides Again, in which she starred opposite Buster Crabbe. She had one uncredited role afterward, in the 1951 film Chain of Circumstance.

In total, Meredith starred in over 50 films, 32 of which were westerns.

Personal life and death
Meredith married television director Abby Berlin, and retired from acting shortly thereafter. In later life, she was diagnosed with cancer, which claimed her life on January 22, 1980, in Los Angeles, California. She was 64 years old. She is interred at Forest Lawn Memorial Park in Glendale, California.

Partial filmography

 Hat Check Girl (1932) - Sales Lady (uncredited)
 Roman Scandals (1933) - Shantytown Resident / Goldwyn Girl (uncredited)
 Lottery Lover (1935) - Manicurist (uncredited)
 George White's 1935 Scandals (1935) - Miss Smith - Secretary (uncredited)
 Tumbling Tumbleweeds (1935) - Girl (uncredited)
 Ticket to Paradise (1936) - Girl (uncredited)
 Bulldog Edition (1936) - Camille Club Hatcheck Girl (uncredited)
 The Cowboy Star (1936) - Mary Baker
 Rio Grande Ranger (1936) - Sandra Cullen
 The Gambling Terror (1937) - Betty Garret
 Trail of Vengeance (1937) - Jean Warner
 A Lawman Is Born (1937) - Beth Graham
 The Mystery of the Hooded Horsemen (1937) - Nancy Wilson
 Outlaws of the Prairie (1937) - Judy Garfield
 All American Sweetheart (1937) - Alice (uncredited)
 Murder Is News (1937) - Ann Leslie
 Little Miss Roughneck (1938) - Girl (uncredited)
 Cattle Raiders (1938) - Nancy Grayson
 Call of the Rockies (1938) - Ann Bradford
 Law of the Plains (1938) - Marion McGowan / Norton
 West of Cheyenne (1938) - Jean Wayne
 South of Arizona (1938) - Ann Madison
 I Am the Law (1938) - Eddie's Girlfriend (uncredited)
 The Colorado Trail (1938) - Joan Randall
 West of the Santa Fe (1938) - Madge Conway
 The Spider's Web (1938, Serial) - Nita Van Sloan
 The Thundering West (1939) - Helen Patterson
 Texas Stampede (1939) - Joan Cameron
 First Offenders (1939) - Mary Kent
 Spoilers of the Range (1939) - Madge Patterson
 Western Caravans (1939) - Joyce Thompson
 The Man from Sundown (1939) - Barbara Kellogg
 Overland with Kit Carson (1939, Serial) - Carmelita Gonzalez
 Riders of Black River (1939) - Linda Holden
 Outpost of the Mounties (1939) - Norma Daniels
 Those High Grey Walls (1939) - Mary MacAuley
 The Taming of the West (1939) - Pepper Jenkins
 Beware Spooks! (1939) - Babe, Spook House Ticket Seller (uncredited)
 Two-Fisted Rangers (1939) - Betty Webster
 Convicted Woman (1940) - Nita Lavore
 Blazing Six Shooters (1940) - Janet Kenyon
 The Man from Tumbleweeds (1940) - 'Spunky' Cameron
 Texas Stagecoach (1940) - Jean Harper
 The Return of Wild Bill (1940) - Sammy Lou Griffin
 The Green Archer (1940, Serial) - Valerie Howett
 Thundering Frontier (1940) - Norma Belknap
 Caught in the Act (1941) - Lucy Ripportella
 The Son of Davy Crockett (1941) - Doris Mathews
 Louisiana Purchase (1941) - Lawyer's secretary
 The Rangers Take Over (1942) - Jean Lorin
 The Kid Rides Again (1943) - Joan Ainsley
 Chain of Circumstance (1951) - Minor Role (uncredited) (final film role)

References

External links
 

Iris Meredith at b-westerns.com

Actresses from Iowa
Deaths from cancer in California
American film actresses
20th-century American actresses
Actors from Sioux City, Iowa
1915 births
1980 deaths
Western (genre) film actresses